The following lists events that happened during 1893 in New Zealand.

With the sudden death of John Ballance on 27 April the 13 years of Richard Seddon as Prime Minister begins. On 28 November New Zealand women become the first in the world to vote in a national election.

Incumbents

Regal and viceregal
Head of State – Queen Victoria
Governor – David Boyle, 7th Earl of Glasgow

Government and law
The Electoral Bill granting women the franchise is given Royal Assent by Governor Lord Glasgow on 19 September, and women voted for the first time on 28 November (see Women's suffrage in New Zealand). 

The Liberal Party is re-elected on 28 November and begins the 12th New Zealand Parliament.

Speaker of the House – William Steward
Prime Minister – John Ballance dies on 27 April and Richard Seddon becomes the new Prime Minister.
Minister of Finance – On 1 May Joseph Ward becomes Minister of Finance, four days after the death of John Ballance.
Chief Justice – Hon Sir James Prendergast

Parliamentary opposition
Leader of the Opposition – William Rolleston (Independent) until 8 November, then William Russell (Independent).

Main centre leaders
Mayor of Auckland – William Crowther followed by James Holland
Mayor of Christchurch – William Prudhoe followed by Eden George
Mayor of Dunedin – Charles Haynes followed by Henry Fish
Mayor of Wellington – Francis Bell

Events

Arts and literature

Music

Sport

Athletics

The first Australia and New Zealand Championships are held. Tim O'Connor (in the Shot Put) is the first New Zealander to win an event. These combined Championships are held biennially until 1927 except during World War I.

The hammer throw is held for the first time at a New Zealand National Championships.

National Champions, Men
100 yards – Jack Hempton (Wellington)
250 yards – L. Harley (Wellington)
440 yards – Norman L. Gurr (Wellington)
880 yards – Norman L. Gurr (Wellington)
1 mile – C. Rees (Canterbury)
3 miles – William J. Burk (Otago)
120 yards hurdles – W. Moir (Canterbury)
440 yards hurdles – D. Matson (Canterbury)
Long jump – Ross F. Gore (Wellington)
High jump – tie Ross F. Gore (Wellington) and F. Meyrick (Canterbury)
Pole vault – W. West (Canterbury)
Shot put – O. McCormack (Wellington)
Hammer throw – O. McCormack (Wellington)

Billiards
The second firm in the country to begin the manufacture of billiard tables does so in Auckland.

Chess
National Champion: Franz Vaughan Siedeberg of Dunedin. (his 2nd title)

Cricket

Golf
The New Zealand Amateur Championships are held for the first time. They are hosted by the Otago Golf Club and staged at the Balmacewan course.

National Champion – Men: J. Somerville (Otago)
National matchplay champion – Women: Mrs. Lomax-Smith (Christchurch)

Horse racing

Harness racing
 Auckland Trotting Cup (over 3 miles) is won by Sandfly

Thoroughbred racing
 New Zealand Cup – Rosefeldt
 New Zealand Derby – Skirmisher
 Auckland Cup – Pegasus
 Wellington Cup – Retina

Season leaders (1892/93)
Top New Zealand stakes earner – St Hippo
Leading flat jockey – T. Buddicombe

Lawn Bowls

National Champions
Singles – W. Cowie (Dunedin)
Fours – W. Barnett, C. Hulbert, H. Toomer and H. Thomson (skip) (Christchurch)

Polo
Savile Cup winners: Christchurch

Rowing
National Champions (Men)
Single sculls – J. McGrath (Otago)
Double sculls – Union, Christchurch
Coxless pairs – Union, Christchurch
Coxed fours – Lyttelton

Rugby union
 1893 New Zealand rugby union tour of Australia
Provincial club rugby champions include:

Shooting
Ballinger Belt – Private A. Ballinger (Wellington Guards)

Soccer
Provincial Champions:
Auckland: Alliance Auckland
Wellington:Wellington Rovers

Swimming
National Champions (Men)
100 yards freestyle – H. Hodges (Auckland)
220 yards freestyle – H. Bailey (Auckland)
440 yards freestyle – H. Bailey (Auckland)
880 yards freestyle – H. Bailey (Auckland)

Tennis
National Champions
Men's singles – M. Fenwicke
Women's singles – J. Rees
Men's doubles – Richard Harman  and Frederick Wilding
Women's doubles – Not held

Births
30 January: George Yerex, wildlife conservator

Deaths
 23 January: Henry Driver, politician 
 27 February (in London): Sir Charles Clifford, 1st Baronet, politician, first speaker of the House of Representatives. 
 1 March (in Yorkshire): Mary Taylor, Wellington draper and women's rights advocate.
 22 March:  Theophilus Daniel, politician. 
 27 April: John Ballance, politician & Premier.
 28 April: Thomas King, politician (born 1821).
 15 December: Alphonse J. Barrington, gold prospector and explorer (born c. 1832).

See also
Women's suffrage in New Zealand 
History of New Zealand
List of years in New Zealand
Military history of New Zealand
Timeline of New Zealand history
Timeline of New Zealand's links with Antarctica
Timeline of the New Zealand environment

References
General
 Romanos, J. (2001) New Zealand Sporting Records and Lists. Auckland: Hodder Moa Beckett. 
Specific

External links